The 1999 World Netball Championships (also known as the Vodafone World Netball Championships for sponsorship reasons) was the tenth edition of the INF Netball World Cup, a quadrennial premier event in international netball. It was held in Christchurch, New Zealand from 21 September to 2 October 1999 and featured 26 teams with the debut of Niue, Tonga and Zambia. All matches were held at the Westpac Arena.

Fourteen teams entered the preliminary round with four teams qualifying to the main round where they were joined by the top twelve teams from the 1995 championships. The main round saw sixteen teams remaining, be split into two groups of eight with the top four qualifying to the quarter-finals while the remaining eight played in classification matches for 9th–16th placings.

Australia and New Zealand defeated England and Jamaica in the semi-finals, for a repeat of the 1995 final. Australia defended its seventh title defeating New Zealand in the final on a final-second shot by Sharelle McMahon, after coming back from six goals down at three-quarter time. England claimed the bronze medal, defeating Jamaica by fourteen goals.

Preliminary rounds
The competition started with two days of sixteen teams contesting in two rounds of knockout matches for the four remaining spots in the main competition, the remaining twelve teams entered the consolation round. Pakistan and Botswana were also meant to compete in the tournament but had to withdraw.

Round 1
The opening day of the competition started with wins for six teams with Wales securing the widest point spread of the day with an 82–13 romp over Vanuatu which saw Mair Evans scoring 57 goals. For Scotland, they had a nervous start in their match against the Cayman Islands with Scotland only leading by three goals at the half time break. But a switch to bring in Gail Higgins into goal attack saw the Scots win by 29 goals. Zambia had the closest match of the opening day with their match over Papua New Guinea having a margin of only two goals in what was a see-saw match. There was also wins for Fiji, Tonga and Malaysia who opened their 1999 campaign with a win.

Round 2
Day two of the 1999 edition saw the remaining eight teams in the preliminary round ply in four matches to determine the final four spots in the top 16. In the biggest victory of the day, Fiji defeated Zambia by twenty nine goals off the back of a blistering start while fellow Pacific neighbours Tonga lost their second round match to Northern Ireland after conceding sixteen goals in the third quarter while only scoring five. Wales built a solid lead in the first two quarter finals to overcome Scotland by eighteen goals despite Scotland winning the final quarter. The final match of the preliminary round saw Singapore sealed a twenty-two goal victory over Malaysia off the back of former Australian B goal-shooter Jocelyn Bryant as she scored 44 goals from 49 attempts.

Consolation round

Group A

Group B

Semi-finals

Placement matches

Main round

Group A

Group B

Classification matches

Quarter-finals

Semi-finals

Playoff 9-16

Finals

Quarter-finals

Semi-finals (5-8)

Semi-finals

7th place match

5th place match

Bronze medal match

Gold medal match

Final placings

Medallists

References

External links
 TVNZ perspective on the defeat of New Zealand

1999
1999 in netball
net
World
Sports competitions in Christchurch
1990s in Christchurch
September 1999 sports events in New Zealand
October 1999 sports events in New Zealand